Ludwig Fellermaier (1930–1996) was a German politician. From 1968–1989 he served as a Member of the European Parliament (MEP), representing Germany for the Social Democratic Party. From 1979–1982 he served as Chair of the Delegation to the Joint Parliamentary Committee of the EEC-Turkey Association. From 1987–1989 he served as Vice-Chair of the Delegation for relations with Turkey and for several months during 1989 served as Vice-Chair of the Delegation to the EEC-Turkey Joint Parliamentary Committee.
He also served several periods as Chair of the Socialist Group in the European Parliament.

References

1930 births
1996 deaths
Politicians from Vienna
MEPs for Germany 1958–1979
MEPs for Germany 1979–1984
MEPs for Germany 1984–1989
Social Democratic Party of Germany MEPs
Knights Commander of the Order of Merit of the Federal Republic of Germany